Topomeigenia is a genus of parasitic flies in the family Tachinidae. There are at least four described species in Topomeigenia.

Species
These four species belong to the genus Topomeigenia:
 Topomeigenia andina (Townsend, 1929)
 Topomeigenia grisea (Townsend, 1927)
 Topomeigenia maturina Townsend, 1919
 Topomeigenia matutina Townsend

References

Further reading

 
 
 
 

Tachinidae
Articles created by Qbugbot